The redbanded weever (Parapercis binivirgata) is a sandperch of the family Pinguipedidae found around Australia and New Zealand at depths between .

References

 
 Tony Ayling & Geoffrey Cox, Collins Guide to the Sea Fishes of New Zealand,  (William Collins Publishers Ltd, Auckland, New Zealand 1982)

External links
 Parapercis binivirgata @ fishesofaustralia.net.au

Pinguipedidae
Marine fish of Eastern Australia
Taxa named by Edgar Ravenswood Waite
redbanded weever